The Westpac Canterbury Centre (also known as the Westpac Building or Westpac Trust Building) was a landmark tower on the corner of High Street and Cashel Street in the center of Christchurch, New Zealand. Prior to the February 2011 earthquake, it was considered the 9th tallest building in Christchurch, standing at 55 meters tall (14 floors).

The building had a distinct look, with rounded concrete columns on each corner, and a pointed triangular roof. From above, it was shaped like an elongated hexagon.

History 

The Westpac Canterbury Centre was constructed in 1983 for the Trust Bank (then named Canterbury Savings Bank) at 166 Cashel Street. It was designed by architectural firm Warren and Mahoney, and built by C.S. Luney LTD for $6.4 million (New Zealand dollars).

The building originally had a ground floor shopping arcade, which was replaced by a Westpac branch in its later usage.

In 2011, the building was owned by property investor Miles Middleton, who owned three other high-rise buildings in the Christchurch city area.

2010 Canterbury earthquake 

The building suffered notable damage in the 2010 Canterbury earthquake, losing windows (particularly on the upper floors) as well as large pieces of concrete which had chipped away from the outer columns and frame. Occupants were forced to vacate the building from this point onwards.

A barricade was put around the tower for fears that more concrete could loosen and fall onto pedestrians.

2011 Christchurch earthquake 

Following the February earthquake in Christchurch, the Westpac Canterbury Centre remained standing, but was marked for demolition and was labelled as having suffered "major damage" from earthquakes. It fell within the red zone cordon, and was surrounded by other critically damaged buildings.

During the middle of May in 2012, demolition work began on the property. It took just over six months to complete.

UK-based company, McGee Group, spent an estimated $120,000 importing a German-made excavator dubbed the 'Goliath' to help de-construct the building.  It had previously been used in the demolition of the old Wembley Stadium.

References

Christchurch Central City
Office buildings completed in 1983
Buildings and structures demolished as a result of the 2011 Christchurch earthquake
Buildings and structures demolished in 2012
Skyscrapers in Christchurch
1980s architecture in New Zealand
Skyscraper office buildings in New Zealand
Former skyscrapers
Brutalist architecture in New Zealand